Matt Henry  is a Laurence Olivier Award winning  British singer and actor.

His first career highlight was being chosen by the Prince's Trust to perform at the Two Nations Concert at Johannesburg Stadium in 1997 alongside the Spice Girls, Billy Ocean and Omar.

Henry studied at the Roehampton University of Surrey, now known as University of Roehampton, obtaining a Bachelors of Arts Degree in Drama and Sociology  before continuing his theatrical training at the Urdang Academy in London's Covent Garden.

Henry answered an open call to audition as understudy for Simba in The Lion King while he was in his second year at Urdang Academy in London.  As a student, he was not supposed to audition for professional roles, but skipped his classes.  When he returned, the principal summoned Henry to his office and asked where he had been.  He said he was ill and the principal told him that the casting director of The Lion King called and said he had the part.

His early West End credits include Saturday Night Fever and Avenue Q.

In 2013, Henry competed in series two of the BBC's The Voice UK, where he was mentored by both will.i.am and Jessie J. He reached the grand final and ultimately finished in fourth place. His performance of Ray LaMontagne's "Trouble" has received over 12 million hits on YouTube, and LaMontagne’s original recording re-entered the UK Singles Chart following the airing of Henry's performance.

In 2015, he released his debut solo album Red Flare, which was recorded live at the studio owned by The Feeling’s Dan Gillespie and produced by Mr Hudson. He promoted the album with a UK tour supporting pop icon Cyndi Lauper.

In December 2017, he received an MBE in the New Years Honours list for his contribution to theatre.

In 2020, he originated the role of Frankie The Foetus in Jonathan Harvey's play Our Lady of Blundellsands at the Everyman Theatre, Liverpool.

In 2020, Matt co-created and starred in the new musical, The Drifters Girl, alongside Beverley Knight. The show delayed its original October 2020 opening at the Garrick Theatre in London, due to the COVID-19 pandemic, eventually opening in November 2021, following previews at the Theatre Royal, Newcastle-Upon-Tyne in October 2020.

Filmography & Television

Theatre Credits

Music

Accolades

References

Living people
The Voice UK contestants
British male musical theatre actors
Laurence Olivier Award winners
Black British male actors
21st-century Black British male singers
Members of the Order of the British Empire
Year of birth missing (living people)